The American Speech–Language–Hearing Association (ASHA) is a professional association  for speech–language pathologists, audiologists, and speech, language, and hearing scientists in the United States and internationally. It has more than 218,000 members and affiliates.

The mission of the American Speech–Language–Hearing Association is to promote the interests of and provide the highest quality services for professionals in audiology, speech–language pathology, and speech and hearing science, and to advocate for people with communication disabilities.

The association's national office is located at 2200 Research Boulevard, Rockville, Maryland.  The organization also has an office on Capitol Hill.

Vicki R. Deal-Williams is currently serving as the association's chief executive officer.

History
ASHA was founded in 1925 as the American Academy of Speech Correction.  The current name was adopted in 1978.

Council for Academic Accreditation 
The Council for Academic Accreditation in Audiology and Speech–Language Pathology (CAA) is the accreditation unit of the ASHA. Founded over 100 years ago by American universities and secondary schools, CAA established standards for graduate program accreditation that meet entry-level preparation in the speech and hearing field. Accreditation is available for graduate programs with a master's degree in Speech–Language Pathology or clinical doctoral program in audiology.

ASHA membership benefits
Professionals of Communication Sciences and Disorders (CSD) can become members of ASHA.  These professionals include audiologists, speech-language pathologists, and speech-language-hearing scientists.  As of December 31, 2021, there are more than 218,000 members and affiliates of ASHA.  Opportunities ASHA membership brings include access to publications associated with ASHA, to continuing education programs through ASHA, to a platform to network with other CSD professionals, to career-building tools, and to money-saving programs.

Special interest groups 
ASHA sponsors special interest groups (SIGS) within the organization as a means of promoting community and learning in more specialized topics. As of 2016, ASHA has 19 established Special Interest Groups (SIG). These have been added through the years. ASHA members can be a SIG Affiliate of any number of SIGS, with each affiliation requiring nominal yearly dues. The 19 SIGS are:
 SIG 1: Language Learning and Education
 SIG 2: Neurogenic Communication Disorders
 SIG 3: Voice and Voice Disorders
 SIG 4: Fluency and Fluency Disorders
 SIG 5: Craniofacial and Velopharyngeal Disorders
 SIG 6: Hearing and Hearing Disorders: Research and Diagnostics
 SIG 7: Aural Rehabilitation and Its Instrumentation
 SIG 8: Audiology and Public Health
 SIG 9: Hearing and Hearing Disorders in Childhood
 SIG 10: Issues in Higher Education
 SIG 11: Administration and Supervision
 SIG 12: Augmentative and Alternative Communication
 SIG 13: Swallowing and Swallowing Disorders (Dysphagia)
 SIG 14: Cultural and Linguistic Diversity
 SIG 15: Gerontology
 SIG 16: School-Based Issues
 SIG 17: Global Issues in Communication Sciences and Related Disorders
 SIG 18: Telepractice
 SIG 19: Speech Science

References

External links
Association website
The National Student Speech Language and Hearing Association

1925 establishments in the United States
Medical associations based in the United States
Speech and language pathology
Medical and health organizations based in Maryland